Uloborus pseudacanthus is a spider species found in Portugal.

See also 
 List of Uloboridae species

References

External links 

Uloboridae
Spiders of Europe
Endemic arthropods of Portugal
Spiders described in 1910